St. Gregory the Great High School was a private, Roman Catholic high school in Chicago, Illinois.  It is located in the Roman Catholic Archdiocese of Chicago.

Background
St. Gregory the Great was established in 1937.  It was the first coeducational Catholic school in the Chicago Diocese.
In 2014, the Chicago Archdiocese and the school administration announced that after 75 years, this would be its last. All remaining students will be transferred to Holy Trinity High School at the end of the academic year, or receive $1000 to attend another Catholic high school.  http://www.stgregory.org/

External links
 Official website

References

Private high schools in Chicago
Defunct Catholic secondary schools in Illinois
Educational institutions established in 1937
Educational institutions disestablished in 2013
1937 establishments in Illinois